The Zemeș is a right tributary of the river Tazlăul Sărat in Romania. It discharges into the Tazlăul Sărat in the village Zemeș.

References

Rivers of Romania
Rivers of Bacău County